Andrea Büttner (born 1972) is a German artist. She works in a variety of media including woodcuts, reverse glass paintings, sculpture, video, and performance. She creates connections between art history and social or ethical issues, with a particular interest in notions of poverty, shame, vulnerability and dignity, and the belief systems that underpin them.

Büttner has exhibited in both Europe and North America. Currently, she lives and works in both London and Frankfurt am Main. Büttner uses a broad range of media and techniques most notably video, performance, and installation art. However, her work is not limited to these mediums as she utilizes collage, sculpture, and more to discuss myths, gender, religion, shame, and society.

Life and work
Born in 1972 in Stuttgart, Andrea Büttner studied fine art at the Berlin University of the Arts. From 2003 to 2004, she studied at the University of Tübingen and Humboldt University, where she received a master's degree in art history and philosophy. From 2005 to 2010, she joined the Royal College of Art in London and received her doctorate. Her thesis "Aesthetics of Shame: The relevance of shame for contemporary art and visual culture" focused on the subject of shame, including its queer aspects, as an aesthetic feeling.

Religion is a recurring theme in her work, from her video Little Sisters: Lunapark Ostia (2012), which documents Büttner in conversation with religious sisters. The video features nuns in an amusement park outside of Rome partaking in rides and attractions while discussing their own work. Little Sisters: Lunapark Ostia (2012) is not Büttner's only work to feature nuns, her short film Little Works (2007) features nuns making small objects, such as candles. Büttner's other work Vogelpredigt (Sermon to the Birds, 2010) reflects Christian iconography.

Exhibitions

Selected solo shows 
 2007 - On the spot #1, Badischer Kunstverein, Karlsruhe, Germany
 2008 - Nought to Sixty – Andrea Büttner, Institute of Contemporary Arts, London
 2009 - Andrea Büttner, Croy Nielsen, Berlin, Germany
 2011 - The Poverty of Riches, Whitechapel Gallery, London / Collezione Maramotti, Reggio Emilia, Italy
 2012 - Andrea Büttner, International Project Space, Birmingham, UK
 2013 - Andrea Büttner, MK Gallery, Milton Keynes, UK
 2014 - Piano Destructions, Walter Phillips Gallery, The Banff Centre, Banff, Canada
 2014 - BP Spotlight: Andrea Büttner, Tate Britain, London
 2014 - Andrea Büttner. 2, Museum Ludwig, Cologne, Germany
 2015 - Andrea Büttner, Walker Art Center, Minneapolis, USA
 2016 - Beggars and iPhones, Kunsthalle Wien, Vienna, Austria
 2017 - Andrea Büttner «Gesamtzusammenhang», St. Gallen, Switzerland

Awards
 2005 - British Institution Award, London
 2009 - Maria Sibylla Merian Prize, Wiesbaden
 2009 - Kunststiftung Baden-Württemberg Grant 
 2009-2011 - MaxMara Art Prize, organized by Collezione Maramotti
 2012 - 1822-Kunstpreis, Frankfurt am Main
 2017 - Turner Prize Nominee, London

See also
 List of German women artists

References

External links
 

1972 births
Living people
German contemporary artists
21st-century German women artists
21st-century German artists
Artists from Stuttgart
Berlin University of the Arts alumni
Humboldt University of Berlin alumni
Alumni of the Royal College of Art